The Monastery of Saint Ammonius, also known as the Monastery of the Martyrs, is a Coptic Orthodox monastery near Esna.

See also
Coptic monasticism

References

2000 Years of Coptic Christianity. By Meinardus, Otto F. A. 1999. American University in Cairo Press. .
Christian Egypt: Coptic Art and Monuments Through Two Millennia. By Capuani, Massimo. 1999. Liturgical Press. .
Churches and Monasteries of Egypt and Some Neighboring Countries. By Abu Salih the Armenian. Edited and Translated by Evetts, B.T.A. 2001. Gorgias Press. .

Martyrs
Martyrs
Buildings and structures in Luxor Governorate